Mikaszówka  is a village in the administrative district of Gmina Płaska, within Augustów County, Podlaskie Voivodeship, in north-eastern Poland, close to the border with Belarus.

The village has a population of 90.

The Mikaszówka Lock of the Augustów Canal is located in Mikaszówka.

History

In 1827, Mikaszówka had a population of 95, and in the late 19th century it had a population of 128.

Maciątek died of exhaustion in the Sachsenhausen concentration camp in June 1940, while Konstantynowicz was murdered in the Hartheim Euthanasia Centre in August 1942 (see Nazi crimes against the Polish nation).

References

Villages in Augustów County
Białystok Voivodeship (1919–1939)